The Saskatchewan Legislative Network is the province-wide cable television network that broadcasts sessions of the Legislative Assembly of Saskatchewan, similar to the Ontario Parliament Network. The network is available on cable television, much like the educational Saskatchewan Communications Network.

External links
 Saskatchewan Legislative Network in SK

Commercial-free television networks
Legislature broadcasters in Canada
Politics of Saskatchewan
Television stations in Saskatchewan
Saskatchewan Legislature
Television channels and stations established in 1983
1983 establishments in Saskatchewan